Dorothy Moore may refer to:

Dorothy Moore (1946– ), American blues and gospel singer
Dorothy Rudd Moore (1940– ), African-American composer and music educator
Debbie Moore (1946– ), model and businesswoman
Dorothy Dury (c.1613–1664), Anglo-Irish writer on education